George Cave may refer to:

 George Cave, 1st Viscount Cave (1856–1928), British lawyer and politician
 George Cave (footballer) (1874–1904), English footballer
 George W. Cave (born 1929), CIA operations officer and authority on Iran